Paul Binder (born October 19, 1942) is the founder, founding artistic director and former ringmaster of the Big Apple Circus.

Early life and education
Binder was born on October 19, 1942, in Brooklyn, New York to a Jewish family. He graduated with a bachelor's degree from Dartmouth College in 1963 and MBA from Columbia University in 1967. At Dartmouth, he had his first show business experience as an improv comedian with the Dartmouth Players. One of Dartmouth's educational philosophies was a belief in community service, which Binder embraced with the Big Apple Circus' community programs.

Big Apple Circus 
Binder became known in New York City for his juggling abilities, but he sought a larger audience. With this in mind, he set to tour around Europe, bringing in his performing instruments with him.

Binder was a street artist when he and Michael Christensen decided to make circus performing their profession. At the time, they were in Kent, England. They made their living as street performers, traveling from London to Istanbul. Soon after, they finalized an accord to tour France with the Nouveau Cirque de Paris. Along with Christensen, Binder also participated in the famed Casino de Paris, as well as on French television shows.

Binder founded the Big Apple Circus, with Christensen later being named co-founder, after they returned from Europe in 1977.

Binder's dedication to circus life and the success of the Big Apple Circus have helped him garner a variety of awards and honors, many of which he shares with Christensen. Both men were elected to honorary memberships in the New York arts and literary organization The Lotos Club.

In 2001, Binder was declared a "New York City Living Landmark" by the New York Landmarks Conservancy society.

In October 2008, The New York Times reported that Binder would be retiring from his role as ringmaster and artistic director for the Big Apple Circus in 2009, although he continued to work behind the scenes as founder and founding artistic director. During that time, ABC News named Binder "Person of the Week".

Binder published his memoir Never Quote the Weather to a Sea Lion and Other Uncommon Tales from the Founder of the Big Apple Circus in April 2013. It has a foreword by Glenn Close.

In 2017, Binder and Christensen performed at the 50th annual Smithsonian Folklife Festival to "hand over the keys" to the circus' new leadership after it emerged from filing for bankruptcy the year before, which in the Big Apple Circus' case was a rubber chicken and a top hat.

Other career
After college, Binder moved to Boston, where he was hired by WGBH-TV as a Floor Manager for Julia Child's The French Chef, and he later worked in New York City and Los Angeles as Talent Coordinator with The Merv Griffin Show and Associate Producer of the original Jeopardy! That same year, Paul married Vivian Bachrach. Later on, Binder went to San Francisco, where he auditioned for and joined the San Francisco Mime Troupe, meeting Christensen, while performing with that company.

In 2016, Binder performed in his cabaret THE TALL AND SHORT OF IT with co-star Dana Mierlak.

In 2017, Binder performed in another cabaret P-P-P-Paul and K-K-K-Katie with co-star Katie Galuska.

Recognition
Binder has received an honorary Doctorate of Fine Arts from Dartmouth College, his alma mater. He was also honored by Long Island University (Doctor of Humane Letters), Pratt Institute, and Rhode Island College.

Personal life 
Binder is the father of four adult children and also has five grandchildren.

References

1942 births
Living people
20th-century American Jews
People from Brooklyn
Dartmouth College alumni
Columbia Business School alumni
American artistic directors
Circus owners
21st-century American Jews